Samuel McGuffin (1863–1952) was Labour Unionist Member of Parliament (MP)  for Belfast Shankill in the Parliament of the United Kingdom from 1918 to 1922, and Ulster Unionist MP in the Parliament of Northern Ireland for Belfast North from 1921 to 1925.

External links
 

1863 births
1952 deaths
Ulster Unionist Party members of the House of Commons of Northern Ireland
Members of the House of Commons of Northern Ireland 1921–1925
UK MPs 1918–1922
Members of the Parliament of the United Kingdom for Belfast constituencies (1801–1922)
Members of the House of Commons of Northern Ireland for Belfast constituencies
Drapers